Saccopteryx is a genus of sac-winged bats from Central and South America. The species within this genus are:

Antioquian sac-winged bat Saccopteryx antioquensis
Greater sac-winged bat Saccopteryx bilineata
Frosted sac-winged bat Saccopteryx canescens
Amazonian sac-winged bat Saccopteryx gymnura
Lesser sac-winged bat Saccopteryx leptura

References

 
Bat genera
Taxa named by Johann Karl Wilhelm Illiger